Cortinarius microarcheri is a basidiomycete fungus of the genus Cortinarius native to South and Western Australia, where it grows under Eucalyptus.

See also

List of Cortinarius species

References

External links

microarcheri
Fungi native to Australia
Fungi described in 1933